Ippolito Caffi (1809–1866) was an Italian painter of architectural subjects and seascapes or urban vedute.

Biography
He was born at Belluno. His first works were produced at the Academy of Fine Arts of Venice. By 1830, he had won awards for his vedute at the academy. He subsequently moved to Rome, made some reputation by his treatise on perspective, as well as by his investigations on Roman archaeology. In 1843 he visited Greece and the East (Athens, Constantinople, Syria, Egypt, and Malta). The first work of his that created a sensation was Carnival at Venice. This was exhibited at Paris in 1846, and was admired for its brilliant effects of light. Other works are his Panorama of Rome from Monte Mario, Isthmus of Suez, and Close of the Carnival at Rome. He joined revolutionary movements in Venice in 1848, and had to retire into Piedmont. His aim of commemorating in paint the first Italian naval engagement was frustrated when the Re d' Italia, on which he traveled was destroyed on July 20, 1866, by Austro-Venetian fleet at the battle of Lissa, drowning him along with his comrades.

In 2005–2006, an exhibition on Ippolito Caffi was held in his native Belluno.

References

External links

1814 births
1866 deaths
People from Belluno
19th-century Italian painters
Italian male painters
Painters from Venice
Italian vedutisti
19th-century Italian male artists